The women's 10,000 metres walk event at the 2006 World Junior Championships in Athletics was held in Beijing, China, at Chaoyang Sports Centre on 19 August.

Medalists

Results

Final
19 August

Participation
According to an unofficial count, 25 athletes from 19 countries participated in the event.

References

10,000 metres walk
Racewalking at the World Athletics U20 Championships